Konstantin Nikolayevich Bestuzhev-Ryumin (1829 in Kudryoshki, Nizhny Novgorod Governorate – 1897) was one of the most popular Russian Imperial historians of the 19th century. He held a chair in Russian History at the University of St. Petersburg (1864–85) and was elected into the St. Petersburg Academy of Sciences in 1890. In 1878 he founded and gave his name to the Bestuzhev Courses, "the largest and most prominent women's higher education institution in Russia".

Bestuzhev was born into one of Russia's oldest families; Mikhail Bestuzhev-Ryumin was his uncle. He started out as a journalist, helping Andrey Krayevsky to edit the literary journal Otechestvennye Zapiski where he published numerous reviews of historical and ethnographic works. He was drawn to a moderate wing of the Slavophile movement and welcomed Nikolai Danilevsky's theories. His pupils include Alexander III of Russia, several Grand Dukes from the Romanov family, and historian Sergey Platonov.

Among Bestuzhev's works are a set of popular books on Russia's history, several monographs on medieval paleography, and the two volumes of Russian History. The latter work is considered his magnum opus. Bestuzhev was known for carefully detailing the views of other historians whilst withholding his own opinions.

Citations

Sources 
 Киреева Р. А. Бестужев-Рюмин и историческая наука второй половины XIX века. М., 1990.
 Киреева Р. А. Бестужев-Рюмин К. Н. // Историки России: Биографии / Под ред. А.А. Чернобаева. М., 2001.
 Малинов А. В. К. Н. Бестужев-Рюмин: Очерк теоретико-исторических и философских взглядов. СПб., 2005.
 

1829 births
1897 deaths
People from Bogorodsky District, Nizhny Novgorod Oblast
People from Gorbatovsky Uyezd
Russian nobility
Historians from the Russian Empire
Male writers from the Russian Empire
Academic staff of Saint Petersburg State University
Full members of the Saint Petersburg Academy of Sciences
Imperial Moscow University alumni
Privy Councillor (Russian Empire)